Michael Fraser (born June 28, 1984) is a Canadian former professional basketball player.

Professional career
In July 2013, he signed with KK Igokea. He was released in October after playing only one game. He then returned to Byblos Club for the rest of the season. In November 2014, he signed with Homenetmen Beirut for the 2014–15 season.

On September 1, 2015, he signed with Polfarmex Kutno of the Polish Basketball League. After two seasons with Polish club, in September 2017, he returned to Lebanon and signed with Sagesse Club.

In 2018, he played for Rosa Radom of the Polish Basketball League.

References

External links
 Eurobasket.com profile
 LNB profile
 RealGM.com profile

1984 births
Living people
BC Dnipro-Azot players
BCM Gravelines players
BSC Fürstenfeld Panthers players
Canadian expatriate basketball people in Austria
Canadian expatriate basketball people in Poland
Canadian expatriate basketball people in the United States
Canadian men's basketball players
Centers (basketball)
KK Igokea players
Oklahoma Baptist Bison basketball players
Power forwards (basketball)
Basketball players from Ottawa
Sagesse SC basketball players